Portland was a steam tug built in Portland, Oregon, United States.  This vessel was also known as Clayoquat and Phoenix.

Career
Portland was launched on April 9, 1875 in Portland, Oregon. The vessel was operated for 15 years on the Columbia and Willamette Rivers, and then was transferred to Puget Sound. From 1891 to 1895, Portland operated out of Everett, Washington, piloted by Captain James Hastings.

Drift and recovery
In 1897, Portland was hauled out at Ballard, Washington, for repairs. Somehow she broke free from the shipway and floated off unoccupied.  Eventually, Portland drifted north into Canadian waters, where she was recovered as a derelict by the B.C. Salvage Company. She came under the control of R.P. Rithet and Company, a prominent British Columbia shipping concern that re-purposed her to a passenger steamer. She was renamed Clayoquat and ran on passenger routes out of Port Renfrew, on the west coast of Vancouver Island.  Clayoquat later passed to the H.Bell-Irving Company, and was used by them as a cannery tender under the name Phoenix.

See also

References 

1875 ships
Propeller-driven steamboats of Washington (state)
Steamboats of the Columbia River
Passenger ships of Canada
History of British Columbia
Steam tugs of Washington (state)